Liesbeth Schlumberger is an organist from South Africa, professor assistant of organ at the Conservatoire national supérieur musique et danse de Lyon since 1996.

Biography 
She then studied at the Conservatoire de Lille with Jean Boyer and also followed improvisation classes with Jean Langlais.

In 1996, she was appointed assistant in the teaching staff of the department of keyboards, organ section of the conservatoire national supérieur musique et danse de Lyon then directed by Jean Boyer and more recently by François Espinasse.

She participates in several international competitions, as a participant or as a member of the jury, notably in 2010, in Chartres.

Distinctions 
 1985: First prize of the national radio competition of South Africa
 1989: First prize at the Bordeaux International Organ Competition

References

External links 
 Liesbeth Schlumberger on the site of the Église protestante unie de l'Étoile
 Liesbeth Schlumberger on Orgue en Pays de la Loire
 Dimanche 5 août à 17h30 :Liesbeth Schlumberger on Les amis de l'orgue de la Cathédrale de Chambéry

South African organists
South African women musicians
University of Pretoria alumni
Academic staff of the Conservatoire de Paris
1960s births
Living people
Women organists
Women music educators
21st-century organists
21st-century women musicians